Lead the Way may refer to:

 Lead the Way (album), a 2000 studio album by T.W.D.Y.
 "Lead the Way" (song), a 1985 single by I'm Talking